Most valuable player is an award, typically for the best performing player in a sport or competition.

MVP may also refer to:

Places 
 Fabio Alberto León Bentley Airport (IATA airport code: MVP), an airport in Colombia

People 
 Steve Lombardi, professional wrestler better known as the "Brooklyn Brawler", whose alias was once "MVP"
 Michael Page, professional boxer and mixed martial artist, nicknamed "MVP" (Michael Venom Page)
 Manuel V. Pangilinan, or "MVP", a Filipino businessman and sports executive
 Dale Torborg, professional wrestler better known as "The Demon", whose alias was once "MVP"
 Montel Vontavious Porter, or "MVP", the ring name of professional wrestler Hassan Assad

Arts, entertainment, and media

Music 
 Mark Varney Project - a short-lived jazz fusion collaboration producing 2 albums: Truth in Shredding (1990) and Centrifugal Funk (1991), featuring Frank Gambale, Allan Holdsworth, Brett Garsed, and Shawn Lane
 MVP (compilation album), a reggaeton album by various artists released in 2003
MVP (Mister V album)
 "M.V.P." (song), a 1995 single by underground rapper Big L from Lifestylez ov da Poor and Dangerous
 "MVP", a song by the deathcore band Despised Icon which is included on their fourth album Day of Mourning (album)
 MVP (group), a hip hop group
 MVP (South Korean band), a boy band

Television 
 MVP (TV series), a television drama about the lives of hockey players' wives
 MVP, an Australian sport show hosted by basketball star Steve Carfino
 "The M.V.P." (Schitt's Creek), an episode of Schitt's Creek

Other uses in arts, entertainment, and media 
 MVP (novel), a novel by James Boice
 Michael Van Patrick, known as MVP, a comic book character created by Dan Slott and Stefano Caselli for Marvel Comics
 MVP: Most Valuable Primate, a 2000 comedy film

Computing 
 Hauppauge MediaMVP, a network media player often shortened to "MVP" (Music, Videos, Pictures)
 Microsoft Most Valuable Professional, an award and recognition program
 Minimum viable product, a concept used in software feature estimating
 Model–view–presenter, a software engineering design and architectural pattern
 Most vexing parse, a specific form of syntactic ambiguity resolution in the C++ programming language

Organizations 
 Maharashtra Vikas Party, a political party in India
 Memel People's Party, a defunct pro-German political party in the Memel Territory
 MVP (esports), a Korean esports organization

Science and healthcare 
 Major vault protein, a primary protein associated with the cytoplasmic vault organelle
 Mean venous pressure, (central venous pressure + peripheral venous pressure) ÷ 2
 Minimum viable population, the minimum sustainable population value used in biology, ecology and conservation biology
 Mitomycin-vindesine-cisplatin, a combination chemotherapy regimen
 Mitral valve prolapse, a heart valve condition

Other uses 
 Duri language (ISO 639 code: mvp), an Austronesian language
 Mossberg 100ATR, a trade name for Mossberg Varmint and Predator Rifle, better known as the Mossberg MVP